Events in the year 1873 in Belgium.

Incumbents
Monarch: Leopold II
Head of government: Barthélémy de Theux de Meylandt

Events
 13 January
 Convention with The Netherlands for building water defences on the Zwin comes into effect.
 Treaty with The Netherlands for the building of a railway line from Antwerp to Mönchengladbach over Dutch territory ("Iron Rhine Treaty") signed in Brussels.
 18 May – Law allowing the formation of limited liability companies.
 29 June – Mass demonstration in support of the right of Jozef Schoep, labourer, to use the Dutch language to register his child's birth.
 10 July – Paul Verlaine shoots at Arthur Rimbaud, slightly injuring him.
 8 August – Paul Verlaine sentenced to two years in prison for injuring Arthur Rimbaud with a fire arm.
 23 July – Commercial treaty with France.
 17 August – Law allowing the use of Dutch in courts of law.
 27 December – Formal opening of Brussels Stock Exchange.

Publications
 Ministry of Public Works, Chemin de fer de l'état. Postes – Télégraphes. Compte-rendu des opérations pendant l'année 1872 (Brussels, Fr. Gobbaerts).
 Henri Guillaume, Histoire des bandes d'ordonnance des Pays-Bas (Brussels, Académie Royale)
 Jules Helbig, Histoire de la peinture au pays de Liège
 Émile de Laveleye, Des causes actuelles de guerre en Europe et de l'arbitrage
 Eugène Van Bemmel, Patria Belgica: Encyclopédie nationale, vol. 1 (Brussels, Bruylant-Christophe & Cie., 1874)

Art and architecture

Buildings
 Léon-Pierre Suys, Brussels Stock Exchange
 Concert Noble ballroom, Brussels

Births
 9 February – Maurits Sabbe, man of letters (died 1938)
 28 February – Georges Theunis, politician (died 1966)
 17 June – Clara Ward, Princesse de Caraman-Chimay (died 1926)
 23 July – Marie Janson, politician (died 1960)
 25 July – Henri Meunier, graphic artist (died 1922)
 26 July – Pierre Nolf, scientist (died 1953)
 16 September – Alfred Bastien, painter (died 1955)
 14 December – Joseph Jongen, composer (died 1953)

Deaths
 30 January – Emile Pierre Joseph De Cauwer (born 1828), painter
 5 May – Albert Goblet d'Alviella (born 1790), politician
 6 June – Ignatius Josephus van Regemorter (born 1785), artist
 1 December – Augustin de Backer (born 1809) Jesuit bibliographer
 9 December – Martinus Dom (born 1791), abbot of Westmalle

References

 
Belgium
Years of the 19th century in Belgium
1870s in Belgium
Belgium